Gauribas  is a village development committee in Mahottari District in the Janakpur Zone of south-eastern Nepal. At the time of the 1991 Nepal census it had a population of 4308 people living in 810 individual households.

Media 
To promote local culture, Gauribas has one FM radio station, Radio Sungava 107 MHZ, which is a community radio station.

References

External links
UN map of the municipalities of Mahottari District

Populated places in Mahottari District